The following is a list of notable deaths in June 2004.

Entries for each day are listed alphabetically by surname. A typical entry lists information in the following sequence:
 Name, age, country of citizenship at birth, subsequent country of citizenship (if applicable), reason for notability, cause of death (if known), and reference.

June 2004

1
James Dudley, 94, American baseball player and professional wrestling manager.
Charles Kelman, 74, American ophthalmologist, surgeon, jazz musician, and Broadway producer.
William Manchester, 82, American author and historian.
Bill Reichardt, 73, American professional football player (University of Iowa, Green Bay Packers).
Chang Xiangyu, 80, Chinese opera actress.

2
Mujeeb Aalam, 56, Pakistani playback singer.
Dom Moraes, 65, Indian poet and writer, heart attack.
Nicolai Ghiaurov, 71, Bulgarian opera singer.

3
Joe Carr, 82, Irish golfer.
Joe Cleary, 85, Irish-American baseball player (Washington Senators).
Harald Ganzinger, 53, German computer scientist.
Harold Goodwin, 86, English actor (The Bridge on the River Kwai, The Longest Day, The Ladykillers).
Morris Schappes, 97, American scholar, editor (Jewish Currents) and Marxist activist.
Frances Shand Kydd, 68, English mother of Diana, Princess of Wales.
Jonathan Kramer, 61, Musician and Composer
Quorthon, 38, Swedish musician and founder of the band Bathory, Congenital heart defect.

4
Augie Colon, 76, American musician.
Charles Correll, 60, American cinematographer (Animal House, Star Trek III: The Search for Spock) and television director (Melrose Place), pancreatic cancer.
Wilmer Fields, 81, American baseball player, former Negro league baseball All-Star, heart ailment.
Tesfaye Gebre Kidan, 68-69, Ethiopian general, defense minister and President of Ethiopia.
Steve Lacy, 69, American jazz soprano saxophonist and composer.
Brian Linehan, 58, Canadian television host and interviewer.
Nino Manfredi, 83, Italian actor.
Gord Mills, 76, politician in Ontario, Canada.
Joseph Reboli, 58, American painter.
T. M. Samarasinghe, 61, Sri Lankan cricket umpire.
Anthony Steffen, 73, Italian and Brazilian film actor and screenwriter.
Marvin Heemeyer, 52, American welder and muffler repair shop owner.

5
Iona Brown, 63, British violinist and conductor, cancer.
Jack Foster, 72, British-born New Zealand athlete.
Ronald Reagan, 93, American actor and politician, President (1981–1989), Governor of California (1967–1975), pneumonia and complications from Alzheimer's .

6
Necdet Mahfi Ayral, 96, Turkish actor.
Judy Campbell, 88, English actress.
Simon Cumbers, 36, Irish freelance cameraman/journalist, working for the BBC in Saudi Arabia, killed by Al-Qaeda.
James Roche, 97, American businessman, and Chief Executive Officer (CEO) and Chairman of the Board at General Motors Corporation.
Kate Worley, 46, American comic book writer (Omaha the Cat Dancer).

7
Richard E. Bush, 79, United States Marine master gunnery sergeant and recipient of the Medal of Honor.
Joseph L. Doob, 94, American mathematician, specializing in analysis and probability theory.
Chris Kitsos, 76, American baseball player (Chicago Cubs).
Don Potter, 102, British sculptor.
Eugene Raskin, 94, American musician and playwright.
Donald Trumbull, 95, American special effects pioneer.
Ted Wellington, 82, Australian rules footballer.

8
David Mervyn Blow, 72, British biophysicist.
Mack Jones, 65, American baseball player, former Major League Baseball outfielder with the Atlanta Braves, Cincinnati Reds and Montreal Expos.
Humayun Khan, 27, American soldier serving in the Iraq War.
Máirín Lynch, 87, Irish public figure.
Roderick Macleod, 95, Canadian politician.
Bob Schmitz, 65, American professional football player and scout (Pittsburgh Steelers, Minnesota Vikings).

9
Rosey Brown, 71, American football player, Pro Football Hall of Famer.
Robert MacDonald Ford, 93, American politician and insurance agent.
Ted Martin, 101, Australian cricketer and centenarian.
Ralph Moody, 86, American NASCAR driver and team owner.
Hartley Saunders, 60, Bahamian Olympic triple jumper (men's triple jump at the 1964 Summer Olympics).
Barbara Whiting Smith, 73, American actress (Those Whiting Girls, Beware, My Lovely, Dangerous When Wet).
Brian Williamson, 58, Jamaican gay rights activist and founder of J-Flag, murdered.

10
Ray Charles, 73, American rhythm and blues singer ("What'd I Say", "Georgia on my Mind", "I Can't Stop Loving You") and soul music pioneer.
Kiki Djan, 47, Ghanaian musician, AIDS and drug-related complications.
Xenophon Zolotas, 100, Greek economist and politician, Prime Minister (1989–1990).

11
Egon von Furstenberg, 57, Swiss-born aristocrat and designer, nephew of late Fiat head Gianni Agnelli.
Michel Roche, 64, French Olympic equestrian (gold medal winner in equestrian team jumping at the 1976 Summer Olympics).
Clay Smothers, 69, American politician.
Joyce Symons, 85, Hong Kong educator.

12
Rina Ben-Menahem, 68, Israeli writer.
Walter George Muelder, 97, American social ethicist and Methodist minister.
Stanley O'Toole, 65, British film producer.
Geoffrey Thompson, 67, British businessman, aneurysm.

13
Dorothy Lavinia Brown, 85, American surgeon and politician.
Danny Dark, 65, American announcer.
Dick Durrance, 89, American alpine ski racer, 17-time national champion.
Sir Stuart Hampshire, 89, British philosopher.
Robert Lees, 91, American screenwriter, found decapitated.
Sir Allan Taylor, 85, British army general.
Ralph Wiley, 52, American sports journalist,  heart attack.

14
Ubaldo Calabresi, 79, Italian Roman Catholic bishop.
Fatulla Huseynov, 66, Azerbaijani colonel, murdered.
Ulrich Inderbinen, 103, Swiss mountain guide.
Jack McClelland, 81, Canadian book publisher.
Max Rosenberg, 89, American producer of horror movies.
Noriaki Yuasa, 70, Japanese director, stroke.

15
J. Gwyn Griffiths, 92, Welsh poet and Egyptologist.
Frank Nastasi, 81, American actor and comedian (Lunch with Soupy).
Ahmet Piriştina, 52, Turkish politician, mayor of İzmir, heart attack.
Hatch Rosdahl, 62, American professional football player (Penn State, Buffalo Bills, Kansas City Chiefs).
John Lasarus Williams, 79, Welsh nationalist activist.

16
Barry Cowan, 56, Northern Irish broadcaster.
Herman Goldstine, 90, American computer scientist (ENIAC), Parkinson's disease.
George Hausmann, 88, American baseball player (New York Giants).
Thanom Kittikachorn, 92, Thai military dictator, former Thai prime minister, Complications from stroke .
Hilda Thompson, 85, New Zealand cricketer.

17
Alfred Fischer, 84, German jurist.
Ma Jiajue, 23, Chinese murderer.
Vilayat Inayat Khan, 87, British Sufist.
Jacek Kuroń, 70, Polish dissident and statesman.
Gerry McNeil, 78, Canadian ice hockey player, Stanley Cup-winning National Hockey League goaltender.
Steven Oken, 42, American convicted murderer, executed by lethal injection in Maryland.
Jackie Paris, 79, American jazz singer and guitarist.

18
Doris Dowling, 81,  American actress.
Frederick Jaeger, 76, German-born British character actor.
Paul Johnson, c. 49, American hostage, decapitated by al-Qaeda.
Nek Mohammed, c. 27, Pakistani tribal leader in Waziristan and key Taliban ally, killed by Pakistani military forces.
Moe Radovich, 75, American professional basketball player (Philadelphia Warriors) and college basketball coach (Cal State Fullerton, University of Wyoming).

19
Colin McCormack, 62, Welsh actor.
Aggrey Klaaste, 64, South African journalist and editor.
Jadwiga Rutkowska, 70, Polish Olympic volleyball player (bronze medal winner in women's volleyball at the 1964 Summer Olympics).
Nob Yoshigahara, 68, Japanese mathematician and puzzle expert.

20
Jim Bacon, 54, Australian politician and Premier of Tasmania.
Fred Cogswell, 86, Canadian poet.
Nabil Sahraoui, 37, Algerian militant, head of GSPC and linked to al-Qaeda.

21
Nick de Angelis, 83, American artist.
Leonel Brizola, 82, Brazilian politician, heart failure.
Ted Scott, 85, Canadian Anglican prelate.

22
Bob Bemer, 84, American computer scientist, cancer.
Thomas Gold, 84, American astrophysicist.
Francisco Ortiz Franco, 50, Mexican journalist, murdered.
Carlton Skinner, 91, American naval officer and politician, first civilian governor of Guam.
Mattie Stepanek, 13, American poet and advocate, muscular dystrophy.
Kim Sun-il, 33, South Korean translator, decapitated by Iraqi militants.

23
Peter Birrel, 68, English actor (Doctor Who), cancer.
Rifaat El-Fanagily, 68, Egyptian footballer.
Aleksa Radovanović, 103, Serbian soldier and longest surviving veteran.
Doris Thompson, 101, British businesswoman and owner of Blackpool Pleasure Beach.

24
Ifigeneia Giannopoulou, 40, Greek songwriter, author.
Tau Moe, 95, singer and musician from American Samoa.
Bill Pataky, 74, Canadian Olympic basketball player (men's basketball at the 1952 Summer Olympics).
Trudeliese Schmidt, 61, German operatic mezzo-soprano.
Peter Wragg, 73, British footballer.

25
Morton Coutts, 100, New Zealand scientist and inventor.
Margot Guilleaume, 94, German operatic soprano.
Horacio Iglesias, Argentine swimmer.
Karol Kennedy Kucher, 72, American ice skating champion, pneumonia.
Carl Rakosi, 100, Hungarian-American poet, the last surviving member of the original group of Objectivist poets.

26
Muriel Angelus, 95, British silent film actress.
William H. Avery, 91, American aeronautical engineer.
Naomi Shemer, 74, Israeli songwriter.
Yash Johar, 75, Indian Bollywood film producer.

27
Hugh B. Cave, 93, British writer.
George Patton IV, 80, US Army general and son of George Patton.
Darrell Russell, 35, American National Hot Rod Association drag racer, first racer killed at an NHRA event since 1996.

28
Dormer Andrews, 85, Australia judge.
Jean Boyer, 55, French organist and music professor, cerebral haemorrhage.
Anthony Buckeridge, 92, English author, creator of the Jennings books.
Georges de Caunes, 85, French journalist, writer and television and radio presenter.
Renate Lepsius, 77, German journalist, historian and politician.
Keith "Matt" Maupin, 20, American U.S. Army Private First Class, killed by Islamist militants in Iraq.
Alexander Spirkin, 85, Soviet and Russian philosopher and psychologist.
David A. Thomas, 86, American educator.
Hal Toenes, 86, American baseball player (Washington Senators).

29
Bernard Babior, 68, American physician and research biochemist, prostate cancer.
Hermelindo Fiaminghi, 83, Brazilian painter, designer, lithographer and art critic.
William W. Havens Jr., 84, American physicist, complications from leukemia.
Arik Lavie, 77, Israeli singer and actor, heart disease.
Juan Antonio Lopez, 52, Mexican boxer, fought Wilfredo Gómez, leukemia.
Mohammad Ranjbar, 69, Iranian football player and coach, cerebral disorder.
Stipe Šuvar, 68, Croatian and Yugoslav politician and sociologist.

30
Jamal Abro, 80, Pakistani writer.
Chris Alcaide, 80, American actor, cancer.
Vivica Bandler, 87, Finnish theatre director.
Eddie Burns, 88, Australian rugby player and coach.
Stive Vermaut, 28, Belgian cyclist, brain haemorrhage after heart attack.

References 

2004-06
 06